Colin Keane (born 12 September 1994) is an Irish jockey who competes in flat racing. He was Irish flat racing Champion Jockey in 2017, 2020, 2021 and 2022.

Keane was born in County Meath and rode his first race winner at Dundalk in December 2010.  He became stable jockey for racehorse trainer Ger Lyons in 2014 and won the Irish apprentice jockeys' championship that year with 54 winners, having finished runner-up the previous season. Keane was runner-up to Pat Smullen in the Irish jockeys' championship in 2015 and won his first championship in 2017 with a total of 100 winners. In 2019 he was runner-up in the championship to Donnacha O'Brien, with 103 winners to O'Brien's 111; this was the first season in which two jockeys both rode 100 winners in an Irish season. Keane won his second Irish champion jockeys' title in 2020 with 100 winners, ahead of Shane Foley who finished with 92 wins. Foley had led by 20 winners on 20 August but a run of success for Keane during September and October put him back in the lead and he maintained his advantage to the end of the season. In 2021 Keane achieved the fastest century of winners in an Irish flat jockeys' championship, riding his 100th winner on 28 August to beat the record set by Joseph O'Brien in 2013.

Major wins 
 France
 Grand Prix de Saint-Cloud - (1) - Broome (2021)

 Ireland
 Irish Derby - (1) - Westover (2022)
 Irish 2,000 Guineas - (1) - Siskin (2020)
 Irish Oaks - (1) - Even So (2020)
 Matron Stakes  - (1) - Champers Elysees (2020)
 Phoenix Stakes - (1)  - Siskin (2019)
 Tattersalls Gold Cup - (1) - Helvic Dream (2021)

 Italy
 Premio Lydia Tesio - (1) - Laganore (2017)

 United States
 Breeders' Cup Turf - (1) - Tarnawa (2020)

References 

1994 births
Living people
Irish jockeys
Sportspeople from County Meath